Cash Cash (EP) is the eponymous debut EP by band Cash Cash. On October 7, 2008, it became available in the UK iTunes Store. The EP was also sold exclusively at shows and managed to sell 5,000 copies. All of the songs, with the exception of the acoustic single and "Fairweather Friend", were later featured on their debut album Take It to the Floor.

Background
The song "Fairweather Friend" is taken from the EP By the Bedside, an old EP from Cash Cash, released in 2006 under the name The Consequence. An earlier version also appears on the album The Consequence, released in 2005, and early versions of "Breakout" appear on both The Consequence and By the Bedside.

Track listing

Charts

References 

2008 debut EPs
Cash Cash albums
Universal Republic Records albums